Dame Annabel Alice Hoyer Whitehead,  (née Millar; born 25 January 1943) is a British courtier and former lady-in-waiting to Queen Elizabeth II.

Annabel was born on 25 January 1943 to Frederick Hoyer Millar, 1st Baron Inchyra, and his wife, Anna Judith Elizabeth de Marees van Swinderen.

Court role
Annabel Whitehead was temporary lady-in-waiting (1971–75), extra lady-in-waiting (1975–92), and lady-in-waiting (1992–2002) to Princess Margaret, Countess of Snowdon. In addition, she had held the office of lady-in-waiting to Queen Elizabeth II from 2002 until the Queen's death in 2022.

She was invested as a Lieutenant, Royal Victorian Order (LVO) in 1986. She was elevated to Commander, Royal Victorian Order (CVO) in 2002, and further to Dame Commander, Royal Victorian Order (DCVO) in 2014. She has also received the Queen Elizabeth II Version of the Royal Household Long and Faithful Service Medal for 20 years of service to the British royal family.

Following Elizabeth II's death, she along with the late Queen's other ladies-in-waiting were made "Ladies of the Household", responsible for helping with events at Buckingham Palace.

Personal life
Annabel Millar married Christopher James Bovill Whitehead in 1973. They have two children, Bertie and Daisy.

References

1943 births
Living people
British ladies-in-waiting
Dames Commander of the Royal Victorian Order
Daughters of barons
Place of birth missing (living people)